Enosi Lerna Football Club is a Greek football club, based in Lerna, Argolis, Greece.

Honours

Domestic Titles and honours

 Argolis FCA champion: 2
 2015-16, 2017-18

References

Football clubs in Peloponnese (region)
Argolis
Association football clubs established in 2009
2009 establishments in Greece
Gamma Ethniki clubs